The Qatar World Rally Team is a Qatari World Rally Championship team, based in Cumbria, United Kingdom.

History

They made their debut at the 2012 Rally of Sweden, entering a single Citroën DS3 WRC for Nasser Al-Attiyah and co-driver Giovanni Bernacchini. Al-Attiyah was unable to contest the full season, owing to his qualification for the 2012 Summer Olympics, and the car was variously driven by Chris Atkinson in Finland, Thierry Neuville in New Zealand and Italy, and Hans Weijs, Jr. in Spain.

On 26 November 2012, British based M-Sport announced a new partnership with the State of Qatar and that Mads Østberg and Nasser Al-Attiyah would be driving Ford Fiesta RS WRCs for the 2013 season. The team expanded to include a third and a fourth car, submitting entries for Juho Hänninen and Thierry Neuville.

WRC results

See also
Ford World Rally Team
Citroën World Rally Team
Citroën Junior Team

References

External links

Team profile at WRC.com 

World Rally Championship teams
British auto racing teams